The Zimbabwean national cricket team toured Bangladesh in November 2001 and played a two-match Test series and  three One Day International (ODI) matches against the Bangladesh cricket team. Zimbabwe won the Test series 1–0. In addition, Zimbabwe won the ODI series by 3–0. It was Zimbabwe's last away win in a Test match, until they beat Bangladesh in Sylhet in November 2018.

Squads

Test series

1st Test

2nd Test

ODI Series

1st ODI

2nd ODI

3rd ODI

See also

References

2001 in Zimbabwean cricket
2001 in Bangladeshi cricket
Zimbabwean cricket tours of Bangladesh
International cricket competitions in 2001–02
Bangladeshi cricket seasons from 2000–01